Pandemis emptycta is a species of moth of the  family Tortricidae. It is found in China.

References

	

Moths described in 1937
Pandemis